Ram Mandir is a Hindu temple (mandir) located in Bhubaneswar, near Kharavel Nagar, Janpath, Odisha, India. The temple houses images of the deities Rama, Lakshman, and Sita. The high rising spire of the main temple, visible from many parts of the capital city, is its main attraction. Built and managed by a private trust, the temple complex also comprises shrines devoted to ochre-painted marble idols of Hanuman, Shiva and other gods.

Festivals
Almost every festival of Hindus are celebrated around the year. Ram Navami, Vivaha Panchami, Janmashtami, Dussehra, Shivaratri, Pana Sankranti are the major ones. The magnificent Aarathi during morning and evening draws a lot of devotees. Annual fair is also organised here on the occasion of Raksha Bandhan or Rakhi.

References

External links
Ram temple in Bbhubaneswar at wikimapia
Ram Mandir square

Hindu temples in Bhubaneswar
Rama temples